Salz is a German word meaning salt and may refer to:


Places
 Salzburg, a city in Austria
 Salzburg (state), Austria
 Salz, Rhineland-Palatinate, municipality in Rhineland-Palatinate, Germany 
 Salz, Bavaria, town in the district of Rhön-Grabfeld in Bavaria, Germany 
 Salz (Freiensteinau), district of Freiensteinau, Hesse

People
 Anthony Salz (born 1950), British solicitor
 Rich Salz, original author of InterNetNews

Rivers
 Salz (river), small river in Hesse, Germany
 Salz, the occasional German name of the river Sajó in central Slovakia and northeastern Hungary

See also 
 Selz (disambiguation)
 Sulz (disambiguation)